Julia Elena Astaburuaga Larraín (17 April 1919 - 14 March 2016), better known as Julita Astaburuaga, was a Chilean socialite, recognized as one of the female icons of Chilean high society.

Biography
Coming from a traditional and conservative family, Astaburuaga was the second daughter of Jorge Astaburuaga Lyon and Elena Larraín Velasco between two brothers, Carlos and Jorge. Her paternal grandfather, Jorge Astaburuaga Vergara, served as a deputy, mayor and diplomat. Her maternal grandfather, Carlos Larraín Claro, served as Minister of War and Navy in the governments of Presidents Pedro Montt, Elías Fernández Albano and Emiliano Figueroa Larraín. She lived for a time in Paris and on her return she passed through various schools in Santiago: the Jeanne D'Arc, the English Nuns, the English University and the French Nuns, where she was interned.

In 1939, Astaburuaga shared second place with María Luisa Correa in the national beauty contest, predecessor of Miss Universe Chile (the winner that year was Elisa Ripamonti, future wife of politician Francisco Bulnes Sanfuentes).

Personal and later life
At the age of 27, Astaburuaga married the diplomat Fernando Maquieira Elizalde, with whom she had two children: Cristián, who followed his father's career, and Diego, a poet. Two days after their marriage, celebrated in the Iglesia El Golf in 1947, the couple moved to New York City, where Maquieira became secretary of the Chilean embassy in the United Nations. She accompanied her husband to other countries until she finally returned to Chile in the early 1970s, after which they separated after a quarter of a century of living together. The following decade, she became director of the Corporación Amigos del Teatro Municipal (Friends of the Municipal Theater Corporation).

In 1996, Astaburuaga published a book entitled Así lo hace yo, which includes chronicles about her life and advice on gastronomy and manners, among other topics. In September 2009, knowing her appreciation and rapprochement since she lived with her husband in the diplomatic mission in Peru, she made efforts to bring relations between the two countries closer, which is why she was awarded the "Order of Merit for Distinguished Services", delivered to the Embassy of Peru in Chile.

Astaburuaga died of pancreatic cancer on the morning of 14 March 2016 at the age of 96.

References

1919 births
2016 deaths
People from Santiago
Chilean socialites
Deaths from cancer in Chile
Deaths from pancreatic cancer